Joseph or Joe McDonald may refer to:
 Joseph A. McDonald (1866–1930), American businessman influential in the steel industry
 Joseph E. McDonald (1819–1891), U.S. Representative and Senator from Indiana
Joseph P. McDonald (1919–1994),  U.S. Army Air Corps private instrumental in the Imperial Japanese Navy Air Service's attack on Pearl Harbor
 Country Joe McDonald (born 1942), lead singer of the 1960s psychedelic rock group Country Joe & the Fish
 Joe McDonald (baseball executive) (born 1929), former front office executive in American Major League Baseball
 Joe McDonald (footballer) (1929–2003), Scottish footballer who played for Sunderland and the Scotland national football team
 Joe McDonald (politician) (born 1966), Minnesota state representative and master photographer
 Joe McDonald (third baseman) (1888–1963), Major League Baseball third baseman who played in 1910 with the St. Louis Browns
 Joe McDonald (mobster) (1917–1997), Irish-American gangster of the Winter Hill Gang

See also
Joseph Macdonald (disambiguation)